Rosedale is a station on the Long Island Rail Road's Atlantic Branch in the Rosedale neighborhood of Queens, New York City. The station is at Sunrise Highway, Francis Lewis Boulevard and 243rd Street. Rosedale is part of the CityTicket program and is in Zone 3.

On weekdays, the station is served by Far Rockaway Branch trains and Long Beach Branch trains bypass the station. This setup is reversed on weekends.

History
Rosedale station was originally built by the South Side Railroad of Long Island. Depending on the source, the station was built either on October 28, 1867, May 1870, or July 1871. It was originally named "Foster's Meadow." The station was abandoned in 1889, but may have been used as a freight house when the second station was built that year, and renamed "Rosedale" in 1892.

From there, the station has a similar history to nearby Laurelton station. The eastbound facilities were relocated south of the former station on November 26, 1941 in anticipation of a future grade elimination project, but returned north on March 10, 1942, when the project was canceled probably due to concentration on surplus for World War II.  All facilities were relocated south of the former location again between November 16–18, 1948 when the grade elimination project was resumed. Temporary facilities were built south of the former location on the same days, while the second depot was razed that month. The third elevated station finally opened for westbound trains on October 31, 1950, and for eastbound trains on November 27, 1950.

Station layout
This station has one 10-car long island platform between Tracks 1 and 2 are part of the Atlantic Branch, while the bypass tracks north of Track 1 are part of the Montauk Branch.

Toward the center of the island platform are staircases going down to either side of Francis Lewis Boulevard, which passes under the station. The westernmost staircase has a canopy. The other staircase is at the canopy that covers the brick waiting room that has two small waiting areas with a non-public area in between where the ticket office and windows were once was in. The canopy ends before reaching the eastern side of the platform where a single staircase leads down to a small pedestrian underpass. On the other side of this underpass is an elevator installed in 2008 going up to the extreme eastern end of the platform at the very end of it.  There is a small canopy over the upper landing This underpass leads to Sunrise Highway to the south and North Conduit Avenue to the north between 243nd and 244th Streets running between a police station and its parking lot to reach it.  A rack to lock up bicycles is available between the underpass and the police station.  A park and ride facility used to occupy the space currently used by the police station.  A NYC Department of Transportation muni-meter parking lot is located to the west of the police station, at the southeast corner of North Conduit Avenue and Francis Lewis Blvd.  Permit Parking was cancelled for the field at the southwest corner of North Conduit Avenue and Francis Lewis Blvd in September 2018.  All parking is now at the daily metered rates.  Seventy-three of the parking spots in the Municipal Parking Field will be allocated and reserved for use by the new 116th Police Precinct.

References

External links 

 Francis Lewis Boulevard entrance from Google Maps Street View
 Sunrise Highway entrance from Google Maps Street View
Platform from Google Maps Street View
Waiting Room from Google Maps Street View

Long Island Rail Road stations in New York City
Railway stations in Queens, New York
Railway stations in the United States opened in 1870